Mechnice  (German Muchenitz) is a village in the administrative district of Gmina Dąbrowa, within Opole County, Opole Voivodeship, in south-western Poland.

The village has a population of 980.

References

Mechnice